Willie Gathrel Hefner (April 11, 1930 – September 2, 2009), was a Democratic U.S. Congressman from North Carolina, serving between 1975 and 1999.

Life and career
Born in Elora, Tennessee, Hefner graduated from high school in Sardis, Alabama. He attended the University of Alabama, and he became the president and owner of radio station WRKB in Kannapolis, North Carolina. He was a member of the Harvesters Quartet, a group of gospel music singers based in North Carolina, from 1954 to 1967, and was a television performer on numerous North Carolina TV channels.

In 1974, he was elected as a Democrat to the 94th United States Congress; he served a total of 12 terms, from January 3, 1975 until January 3, 1999, when he retired from Congress.

Hefner built a reputation as an advocate for veterans, and the Veterans Affairs Medical Center in Salisbury, North Carolina, was renamed in his honor on April 16, 1999.

After retiring from Congress, Hefner moved with his wife, Nancy, to Alabama. He served from October 2001 until November 2002 as the District One commissioner for Marshall County, Alabama. He died in Huntsville, Alabama on September 2, 2009 after suffering a brain aneurysm.

References

There is an elementary school named after Bill Hefener in Fayetteville, NC. The school is in the city limits but sits on the edge of Ft. Bragg. The schools serves students in prek-5th grade. Currently, as of 2022 the school is ran by Dr. Donald Cahill and Jessica Cashwell.

External links

|-

1930 births
2009 deaths
20th-century American politicians
20th-century American singers
American gospel singers
American entertainers
Deaths from intracranial aneurysm
Democratic Party members of the United States House of Representatives from North Carolina
People from Lincoln County, Tennessee
Southern gospel performers
University of Alabama alumni